In Greek mythology, Peisistratus or Pisistratus (Ancient Greek: Πεισίστρατος Peisistratos) was a prince of Pylos in Messenia.

Family 
Pisistratus was the youngest son of King Nestor either by Eurydice or Anaxibia. He was the brother to Thrasymedes, Pisidice, Polycaste, Perseus, Stratichus, Aretus, Echephron, and Antilochus.

Mythology 
Pisistratus became an intimate friend of Telemachus, son of Odysseus, and travelled with him on his unsuccessful search for his father.  Like Telemachus, Pisistratus was only a small boy when his father (and brothers Antilochus and Thrasymedes) left to fight in the Trojan War.

Notes

References 

 Herodotus, The Histories with an English translation by A. D. Godley. Cambridge. Harvard University Press. 1920. Online version at the Topos Text Project. Greek text available at Perseus Digital Library.
 Homer, The Odyssey with an English Translation by A.T. Murray, PH.D. in two volumes. Cambridge, MA., Harvard University Press; London, William Heinemann, Ltd. 1919. Online version at the Perseus Digital Library. Greek text available from the same website.
 Pausanias, Description of Greece with an English Translation by W.H.S. Jones, Litt.D., and H.A. Ormerod, M.A., in 4 Volumes. Cambridge, MA, Harvard University Press; London, William Heinemann Ltd. 1918. Online version at the Perseus Digital Library
 Pausanias, Graeciae Descriptio. 3 vols. Leipzig, Teubner. 1903.  Greek text available at the Perseus Digital Library.
 Pseudo-Apollodorus, The Library with an English Translation by Sir James George Frazer, F.B.A., F.R.S. in 2 Volumes, Cambridge, MA, Harvard University Press; London, William Heinemann Ltd. 1921. Online version at the Perseus Digital Library. Greek text available from the same website.

Children of Nestor (mythology)
Princes in Greek mythology
Pylian characters in Greek mythology
Characters in the Odyssey